Holingol Huolinhe Airport  is an airport serving the city of Holingol in Tongliao, Inner Mongolia, China. Construction of the airport began in August 2013, and the first inspection flight was conducted on 20 September 2016. It was opened on 2 June 2017.

Facilities
It is capable of handling narrow-body aircraft such as the Boeing 737 and the Airbus A320. It is projected to handle 150,000 passengers and 1000 tons of cargo annually by 2020.

Airlines and destinations

See also
List of airports in China
List of the busiest airports in China

References

Airports in Inner Mongolia
Tongliao
2017 establishments in China
Airports established in 2017